Riverdale is a suburb of Gisborne, in the Gisborne District of New Zealand's North Island.

Demographics

Riverdale had a population of 2,646 at the 2018 New Zealand census, an increase of 468 people (21.5%) since the 2013 census, and an increase of 1,008 people (61.5%) since the 2006 census. There were 1,002 households, comprising 1,188 males and 1,458 females, giving a sex ratio of 0.81 males per female, with 381 people (14.4%) aged under 15 years, 357 (13.5%) aged 15 to 29, 927 (35.0%) aged 30 to 64, and 984 (37.2%) aged 65 or older.

Ethnicities were 79.0% European/Pākehā, 27.4% Māori, 1.9% Pacific peoples, 2.8% Asian, and 1.2% other ethnicities. People may identify with more than one ethnicity.

The percentage of people born overseas was 10.3, compared with 27.1% nationally.

Although some people chose not to answer the census's question about religious affiliation, 39.1% had no religion, 49.9% were Christian, 1.6% had Māori religious beliefs, 0.7% were Hindu, 0.2% were Muslim, 0.2% were Buddhist and 1.0% had other religions.

Of those at least 15 years old, 303 (13.4%) people had a bachelor's or higher degree, and 612 (27.0%) people had no formal qualifications. 294 people (13.0%) earned over $70,000 compared to 17.2% nationally. The employment status of those at least 15 was that 837 (37.0%) people were employed full-time, 246 (10.9%) were part-time, and 42 (1.9%) were unemployed.

Parks
Nelson Park is a sports ground, local park and dog walking area, located in Riverdale.

Education

The school includes Te Whare Whai Hua Teenage Parent Centre, a co-educational public school for teenage parents.

The school was established in 1958. The school has hosted a regional chess tournament since 2006.

All these schools are co-educational. Rolls are as of 

The Eastern Institute of Technology has a rural campus in Riverdale. It is used for EIT courses and community-run horticulture and gardening classes.

References

Suburbs of Gisborne, New Zealand